Qezel Tappeh is a village in Kurdistan Province, Iran.

Qezel Tappeh, also rendered as Qiziltepe, may also refer to:
 Qezel Tappeh-ye Ali Qoli, Zanjan Province
 Qezel Tappeh-ye Bayat, Zanjan Province